The Legacy Tower is an under-construction supertall skyscraper in Dhaka, Bangladesh. The skyscraper is a part of Bangabandhu tri-tower: alongside 71-floors Liberation Tower and 52-floors Language Tower and the centerpiece of US$12 billion central business district development project in Purbachal.

The construction of the tri-towers officially commenced on 10 September 2020. The design, created by Heerim Architects and Planners of South Korea incorporates many unique structural and aesthetic features such as solar glass and automatic waste-management systems. As a result, a large portion of the towers' energy demand will be met with renewable energy. The structural consultancy of the project is being provided by Archetype Group of France. The towers are being created by PowerPac Holdings Limited, a joint consortium of Kajima Corporation and Sikder Group.

Location
The Legacy Tower is located in Purbachal, Dhaka.

History
The concept for a supertall-skyscraper was first conceived by Bangladeshi-American industrialist Kali Prodip Chaudhuri. After multiple visits to Bangladesh by delegations of KPC Group, Purbachal was finalized as the location for the skyscraper. Shortly prior to official approval by Rajdhani Unnayan Kartripakkha (RAJUK), the project was shelved over land and other financial disputes. After objection from Civil Aviation Authority, Bangladesh (CAAB) over the height of the tallest skyscraper, the design was revised and the new design of the project was revived in 2019, under public-private partnership between the Government of Bangladesh and Powerpac Holdings Limited. The company purchased 46.1-hectares of site of the Purbachal new town sector 19 in late 2019. In 2020, The Daily Star has reported that Powerpac Holdings Limited have secured ৳600 billion ($7.7 billion) from foreign investments and in process of acquiring additional ৳360 billion ($4.3 billion) in investments. The developer announced that in place of initial 142-story supertall skyscraper, they would construct 111-story Legacy Tower, 71-story Liberation tower and 51-story Language tower. The three towers will be surrounded by 38 additional skyscrapers, which will be constructed during the second phase of the Purbachal CBD project.

Technologies
The building will be able generate electricity through solar and convert waste to energy. The tower will also include sky deck for tourists (Purbachal Eye), an observatory (Dhaka Sky), and a Damper design similar to Taipei 101 (Dhaka Moon).

Surrounding skyscrapers
The Bangabandhu tri-tower project is the centerpiece of Purbachal Central Business District development project. Alongside Legacy tower, the Tri-tower project will include two other towers:

The Purbachal CBD will include 38 other towers ranging from 35 to 50 floor. According to the project blueprint, the township will include:
 Purbachal Business Hotel: The Business Hotel is 42-floor tower with height of at least . 

See also
 List of tallest buildings in Bangladesh
 List of tallest buildings in Dhaka
 List of tallest buildings in the world

References

Purbachal
Proposed infrastructure in Bangladesh
Proposed buildings and structures in Bangladesh
Skyscrapers in Bangladesh